Umbilicus chloranthus is a species of flowering plant in the Crassulaceae family. It is referred to by the common names green Venus' navel and ombelico di Venere verdastro. It is native to Albania, the East Aegean Islands, Greece, Turkey, and Yugoslavia.

References

chloranthus
Taxa named by Theodor von Heldreich
Taxa named by Pierre Edmond Boissier
Flora of Albania
Flora of the East Aegean Islands
Flora of Greece
Flora of Turkey
Flora of Yugoslavia